National Youth Competition may refer to:

National Youth Competition (rugby league), Australia and New Zealand
Ukrainian National Youth Competition - (Association football)